Beaverton is a ghost town in Rawlins County, Kansas, United States.

History
Initially, the community was known as Bird, which was issued a post office in 1880 and a month later changed the name to Beaverton. The post office was discontinued in 1900.

References

Further reading

External links
 Rawlins County maps: Current, Historic, KDOT

Former populated places in Rawlins County, Kansas
Former populated places in Kansas
1880 establishments in Kansas
Populated places established in 1880